Euroschinus is a genus of plant in family Anacardiaceae.

Species

, the World Checklist of Selected Plant Families accepts 9 species:
 Euroschinus aoupiniensis Hoff — New Caledonia
 Euroschinus elegans Engl. — New Caledonia
 Euroschinus falcatus — Eastern Australia
 Euroschinus jaffrei Hoff — New Caledonia
 Euroschinus obtusifolius Engl. — New Caledonia
 Euroschinus papuanus Merr. & L.M.Perry
 Euroschinus rubromarginatus Baker f. — New Caledonia
 Euroschinus verrucosus Engl. — New Caledonia
 Euroschinus vieillardii Engl. — New Caledonia

References

External links

 
Taxonomy articles created by Polbot
Anacardiaceae genera
Taxa named by Joseph Dalton Hooker